Ludwig "Wiggerl" Zausinger (24 February 1929 – 1 March 2013) was a German footballer who played as an attacking right winger. He died at the age of 84.

References

1929 births
2013 deaths
Footballers from Bavaria
Association football midfielders
German footballers
TSV 1860 Munich players
Place of birth missing